Lesnes Abbey Woods, sometimes known as Abbey Wood, is a 73 ha ancient woodland in southeast London, England. It is located near to, and named after, the ruined Lesnes Abbey in the London Borough of Bexley and gives its name to the Abbey Wood district. The woods are adjacent to Bostall Woods.

The woods have several features dating back to the Bronze Age and a fine display of wild bluebells and daffodils in the Spring. The abbey kept fish ponds which were fed by a small stream running down through the woods, and these are still visible today though the water level is often low. 

Local community group Lesnes Abbey Conservation Volunteers (LACV) run practical conservation events to help manage the woodland. They are a registered environmental conservation charity run by local people. The charity was started in 1994, and works closely with Bexley Council who also provide the group with support, to protect and enhance the native wildlife and the important wildlife habitats of Lesnes Abbey Wood. Lesnes Abbey Conservation Volunteers objectives include:

To conserve and maintain for the public benefit Lesnes Abbey Wood and its local environment.
To advance public education in the principles and practices of nature conservation, and the archaeological and geological interest of Lesnes Abbey Wood and its environments.
LACV is a community group which is open to all ages and abilities and works on a varied range of practical conservation tasks throughout the year. The group's conservation tasks include hedge laying, coppicing, fence repair, pond restoration, glade creation, tree planting and heath land restoration. The group also does various wildlife surveys in order to monitor the local native wildlife.

Lesnes Abbey Woods is a Local Nature Reserve and includes the Abbey Wood geological Site of Special Scientific Interest, an important site for early Tertiary fossils. Members of the public can dig for fossils in a small area called the Fossil Bank with the permission of the Lesnes Abbey ranger.

Gallery

References

Ancient woods of London

Parks and open spaces in the London Borough of Bexley
Walking in London
Forests and woodlands of London
Sites of Special Scientific Interest in London
Special Areas of Conservation in England
Local nature reserves in Greater London
Nature reserves in the London Borough of Bexley